Eduardo Javier Lell  (born 9 February 1964) is a retired Argentine football defender who played for several clubs in Latin America, including Cobras de Ciudad Juárez and Sociedad Deportivo Quito.

Lell played for Quito in the Copa Libertadores 1998 competition.

References

External links
 

1964 births
Living people
Argentine footballers
Argentine expatriate footballers
Association football defenders
Liga MX players
S.D. Quito footballers
Expatriate footballers in Mexico
Expatriate footballers in Ecuador
Argentine people of Volga German descent